House of Councillors elections were held in Japan on 21 July 2019 to elect 124 of the 245 members of the House of Councillors, the upper house of the then 710-member bicameral National Diet, for a term of six years.

74 members were elected by single non-transferable vote (SNTV)/First-past-the-post (FPTP) voting in 45 multi- and single-member prefectural electoral districts. The nationwide district elected 50 members by D'Hondt proportional representation with optionally open lists, the previous most open list system was modified in 2018 to give parties the option to prioritize certain candidates over the voters' preferences in the proportional election.

The election saw Prime Minister Shinzo Abe's ruling coalition lose the two-thirds majority needed to enact constitutional reform. The Liberal Democratic Party also lost its majority in the House of Councillors, but the LDP maintained control of the House of Councillors with its junior coalition partner Komeito.

Background
The term of members elected in the 2013 regular election (including those elected in subsequent by-elections or as runners-up) was to end on 28 July 2019. Under the "Public Offices Election Act" (kōshoku-senkyo-hō), the regular election must be held within 30 days before that date, or under certain conditions if the Diet is in session or scheduled to open at that time, between 24 and 30 days after the closure of the session and thus potentially somewhat after the actual end of term.

Going into the election, the Liberal Democratic Party and its coalition partner Komeito controlled a two-thirds super-majority of seats in the House of Representatives but did not control a similar super-majority of seats in the House of Councillors, necessary to initiate amendments of the Constitution of Japan.

Pre-election composition
(as of 15 March 2018)

In the class of members facing re-election, the ruling coalition of the Liberal Democratic Party (LDP), Kōmeitō and Party for Japanese Kokoro (PJK) had a combined 81 of 121 seats (as of March 2018). The governing coalition would have to lose 30 seats or more to forfeit its overall majority in the House of Councillors and face a technically divided Diet. However, as independents and minor opposition groups might be willing to support the government on a regular basis without inclusion in the cabinet, the losses required to face an actual divided Diet may have been much higher. If the Diet is divided after the election, the coalition's two-thirds majority in the House of Representatives can still override the House of Councillors and pass legislation, but certain Diet decisions, notably the approval of certain nominations by the cabinet such as public safety commission members or Bank of Japan governor, would require the cooperation of at least part of the opposition or an expansion of the ruling coalition.

Among the members facing re-election were House of Councillors President Chuichi Date (LDP, Hokkaido), Kōmeitō leader Natsuo Yamaguchi (K, Tokyo) and Minister of Economy, Trade and Industry Hiroshige Seko (LDP, Wakayama at-large district).

District reapportionment 

The following districts saw a change in their representation within the House at this election. One set of reforms were introduced in 2012 and first took effect at the 2013 election. The districts below are affected by the 2015 reforms, which started to take effect in the 2016 election.

In May 2018, the government announced that they are planning to introduce a revision into the Public Offices Election Law before the 2019 election. The proposed changes increased the number seats in the House by 6, 2 seats in the Saitama at-large district and 4 in the national PR block. As Saitama currently has the highest voters-to-councillor ratio, the increase would reduce its ratio gap with the least populous district (below the constitutional 3 to 1 limit). Meanwhile the seat increase in the PR block is aimed to address the absence of representation of prefectures in the merged-prefecture districts (namely Tottori-Shimane and Tokushima-Kōchi) and popular discontent in those prefectures. The plan also introduced a ranking system for the PR lists. This essentially changed it from a most open list system into a less open list system, mirroring the one used in the House of Representatives elections. To reduce the chance of the non-representation of a prefecture, candidates from prefectures not running in the merged districts were to be prioritised on the list.

Under the plan, the new Saitama seat and two new PR seats were contested in 2019, while the other three would be contested in 2022.

Opinion polls

Proportional vote intention

Results

By constituency

Notes

References

Japan
Japan House of Councillors
House of Councillors (Japan) elections
Japan House of Councillors election